Zapotlán may refer to one of several locations in Mexico:

Zapotlán el Grande, city and municipality in the state of Jalisco
Zapotlán de Juárez, city and municipality in the state of Hidalgo
Zapotlán del Rey, city and municipality in the state of Jalisco